Jules Jordan (born May 25, 1972) is an American adult film actor, director, and producer known for his work in gonzo pornography.

Jordan entered the adult film industry as a clerk for a video store. While working in sales, he recruited models and began shooting amateur scenes. In 2006, he launched his production and distribution company Jules Jordan Video. Jordan has been inducted into the AVN and XRCO Halls of Fame.

Early life
Jordan was born in Harrisburg, Pennsylvania. An only child, he was raised by his mother in Hershey; he never met his father. As a teen, Jordan worked at an amusement park, a skateboard shop, an Italian restaurant, a pizza joint, and a Subway restaurant. He attended Hershey High School, where he maintained a varsity position on the wrestling team all four years.

One of his first exposures to pornography was looking through his grandfather's explicit movie collection on 8 mm film.

After trying out a semester of college, Jordan dropped out to work full-time. He began working as a clerk for an adult video store he frequented as a customer.

Career
One of Jordan's first big breaks in the adult film industry was meeting Frank Kay, owner of International Video Distributors (IVD). Kay initially hired Jordan for sales, and then gave him a chance to shoot movies under his established Pleasure and Rosebud labels.

In 1998, Jordan directed the first full-length movie of his career for Pleasure Productions, releasing Live Bait. One of the women he shot, Chastity, helped propel the tape to national notoriety because she was a pro wrestling valet for World Championship Wrestling (WCW). Jordan sold several individual scenes prior to releasing Live Bait, selling early scenes to Odyssey Group and Elegant Angel. He produced more than 50 videos for Pleasure and Rosebud during a two-year span.

In 1999, Jordan moved to Los Angeles after finding it difficult to produce films on the East Coast. He spent his first two months living in an Econo Lodge. After jobs with Vivid Entertainment and Elegant Angel failed to materialize, he started working for IVD again out of his apartment with just a fax machine.

Jordan helped re-invigorate IVD's Rosebud line in 1999–2000, producing, directing and selling titles such as Bottom Feeders (1-4), Deep Cheeks (6-7), Anal Sluts & Sweethearts (4-5) and Heavy Metal (1-2). Jordan won the first AVN Award of his career in 2002 for Heavy Metal, which was honored as the Best Anal-Themed Release.

Jordan signed a DVD distribution deal with John Stagliano's studio Evil Angel in 2001, becoming their top-selling director in his first year on their roster. While working with Evil Angel, he launched  of signature titles such as Ass Worship, Flesh Hunter and Feeding Frenzy, all three of which would go on to become AVN award-winning series. When Jordan left Evil Angel in 2006 he was their top-selling director. Jordan said, "I wanted to control my own destiny, with where my product was headed."

In 2013, Jordan closed a distribution deal with Kink.com to bring their content to DVD for the first time.

In 2015, Jordan signed Jesse Jane to an exclusive performance contract. Under the two-year deal, Jesse will perform in eight movies per year for Jules Jordan Video.

Personal life
Jordan was in a relationship with pornographic actress Jenna Haze. He voiced his support for Democratic candidate Hillary Clinton for the 2016 U.S. presidential election.

Awards

References

External links

 
 
 
 

1972 births
American male pornographic film actors
American pornographic film directors
American pornographic film producers
Film directors from Pennsylvania
Film producers from Pennsylvania
Living people
Male actors from Pennsylvania
People from Hershey, Pennsylvania
Pornographic film actors from Pennsylvania